{{DISPLAYTITLE:C28H34O6}}
The molecular formula C28H34O6 (molar mass: 466.566 g/mol) may refer to:

 Benzodrocortisone, or hydrocortisone 17-benzoate
 Deoxygedunin

Molecular formulas